Adavilo Abhimanyudu is a 1989 Telugu-language adventure-thriller film, produced by S. Venkataratnam and directed by Anil. It stars Jagapathi Babu, Vinod Kumar and Aishwarya (in her acting debut), with music composed by K. V. Mahadevan. The film is a remake of the 1989 Malayalam film Douthyam. The film won two Nandi Awards.

Plot
The film's story is based on the Indian Army's "One Man Commando Operation", undergone by Captain Abhimanyu, in order to find a missing military aircraft. The aircraft is presumed to be in a forest and carrying confidential military secret documents by Captain Suresh.

Cast
Jagapathi Babu as Captain Abhimanyu
Vinod Kumar as Captain Suresh
Aishwarya as Shanti
Ranganath as Col. Raghuram 
Gummadi as Major 
Babu Antony as Max
Sanjeevi as Captain Raju 
KK Sarma as Boxing Refery
Kuali as item number
Priyanka as Leela
Kalpana Rai as Kalpana

Soundtrack

The movie's music was composed by K. V. Mahadevan, and the lyrics were written by Acharya Aatreya. The soundtrack was released by AVM Audio Company.

Awards
Nandi Awards
 Special Jury Award - Jagapati Babu (1989)
 Best Screenplay Writer - Satyanand

References

1989 films

1980s Telugu-language films

Indian action adventure films
Indian romantic drama films
1980s action adventure films
1980s romantic drama films
Films about the military
Films about terrorism in India
Indian Army in films
Military humor in film
Films set in forests
Films scored by K. V. Mahadevan

Telugu remakes of Malayalam films